Caravelas Airport  is the airport serving Caravelas, Brazil.

History
The airport was inaugurated in the 1940s as a military aerodrome and it was renovated between 2010 and 2014.

Airlines and destinations
No scheduled flights operate at this airport.

Accidents and incidents
9 May 1996: a Brazilian Air Force Embraer C-95 Bandeirante registration FAB-2295 crashed during take-off. All crew of 4 died.

Access

See also

List of airports in Brazil

References

External links

Airports in Bahia